Harold Goodwin may refer to:

Harold Goodwin (cricketer) (1886–1917), English cricketer at Cambridge University and Warwickshire
Harold Goodwin (American actor) (1902–1987)
Harold Goodwin (English actor) (1917–2004) 
Harold L. Goodwin (1914–1990), American writer
Harold  Goodwin (American football) (born 1973), offensive line coach

See also
Harry Goodwin (disambiguation)
Goodwin (surname)
Harold Godwin (ca. 1022–1066), king of England
Harry Godwin (1901–1985), English botanist and ecologist